The Frankfurt Art Association is an art museum founded in 1829 by a group of influential citizens of the city of Frankfurt, Germany. The aim of the institution is to support the arts in the city, which was an important center of trade and business. Works of art were bought and exhibitions organized in order to open access to art and culture for the public.

Among the founders were Johann Gerhard Christian Thomas, a senator and later mayor of the city, historian Johann Friedrich Böhmer, and art historian Johann David Passavant.  Soon after the establishment of the museum, many important and influential citizens and artists became members.

Today, the museum is situated in the center of Frankfurt, in a gothic building from 1464 called the Steinernes Haus ('Stone Building'), near the city's town hall.  There are around 1,700 members who support the activities and enable the museum to reach its aim today, more than 150 years after its establishment.  Although the museum has no permanent collection, as art is not purchased any more, its exhibitions of contemporary art are internationally renowned.  Furthermore, guided tours, symposia, film programs, and excursions are organized.  So even in the neighbourhood of important museums, such as the Museum of Modern Art (Museum für Moderne Kunst) and Schirn Gallery (Schirn Kunsthalle), the museum manages to assert itself as an important meeting point not only for Frankfurt's art scene.  Especially young artists of the state-run art school Städelschule and the well-known design school Hochschule für Gestaltung Offenbach am Main are closely connected with the museum and cooperation is common.

Directors of the Frankfurter Kunstverein (since 1945) 
 Curt Gravenkamp (1945–1961)
 Ewald Rathke (1961–1970)
 – Exhibitions (selection): Edvard Munch, 1962; Amedeo Modigliani, 1963; Arnold Böcklin, 1964; Picasso Handzeichnungen, 1965; Wols – Gemälde, Aquarelle, Zeichnungen, Fotos, 1965/1966; Konstruktive Malerei, 1966/1967; Alexej Jawlensky, 1967; Kompass New York, 1967/1968.
 Georg Bussmann (1970–1980)
 Exhibitions (selection): Kunst und Politik, 1970; Renato Guttuso, 1974; Kunst im 3. Reich. Dokumente der Unterwerfung. 1974; George Grosz, 1975
 Peter Weiermair (1980–1998)
 Exhibitions (selection): Robert Mapplethorpe, 1981; Abraham David Christian, 1983, Franz Mon, 1986; Positionen schwedischer Malerei 1873–1995, 1995; PROSPECT Internationale Ausstellungen aktueller Kunst, 1986, 1993, 1996; Lynn Davis, 1990; Das Bild des Körpers, 1993; Luigi Ontani, 1996; Alfred Hrdlicka, 1997; Helen Levitt, 1998.
 Nicolaus Schafhausen (1999–2005)
 Chus Martínez (2006–2008)
 Exhibitions (selection): The Martha Rosler Library, 2006; Whenever It Starts It Is The Right Time, Strategien für eine unstetige Zukunft, 2007; Tommy Støckel, 2007; The Great Transformation – Kunst und taktische Magie, 2008; Natascha Sadr Haghighian – Früchte der Arbeit, 2008;
 Holger Kube Ventura (2009–2014)
 Exhibitions (selection): Das Wesen im Ding, 2010; Sven Johne: Berichte zwischen Morgen und Grauen, 2010; Tales of Resistance and Change – Artists from Argentina, 2010; Die Welt der Weber und Pistolenträger, 2011; Maya Schweizer und Clemens von Wedemeyer Metropolis – Bericht über China, 2011; Über die Metapher des Wachstums, Ragnar Kjartansson, 2011; Grenzen anderer Natur – Zeitgenössische Fotokunst aus Island, 2012; Demonstrationen – Vom Werden normativer Ordnungen, 2012; Kunstgeschichten im Steinernen Haus (1962–2012) – To the People of the City, 2013; Vereinzelt Schauer – Formen von Wetter.
 Franziska Nori (since 2014)
 Exhibitions: I am here to learn: On Machinic Interpretations of the World (2018); Perception is Reality: On the Construction of Reality and Virtual Worlds (2017); Melanie Bonajo: Single Mother Songs from the End of Nature, 2017; Things I Think I Want: Sechs Positionen zeitgenössischer Kunst, 2017; Atchilihtallah – On the Transformation of Things, 2016; Paulo Nazareth: Aqui é Arte, 2016; Mechanismen der Gewalt, 2015; Thomas Feuerstein: Psychoprosa, 2015; Body–Me. Bodies in the Age of Digital Technologies, 2015, with Yuri Ancarani, Kate Cooper, Melanie Gilligan und Thomas Thwaites; Roots. Indonesian Contemporary Art, 2015.

See also
 Kunstverein Bremen
 Kunstverein Nürnberg

External links
 
 Museum für Moderne Kunst
 Schirn Kunsthalle

1829 establishments in Germany
Museums in Frankfurt
Art museums and galleries in Germany
Art museums established in 1829